Kwadwo Baah Agyemang (born January 24, 1975) is a Ghanaian politician and member of the Sixth Parliament of the Fourth Republic of Ghana representing the Asante Akim North Constituency in the  Ashanti Region on the ticket of the New Patriotic Party.

Early life and education 
Agyemang was born on January 24, 1975. He hails from Agogo, a town in the Ashanti Region of Ghana. He attended the Regent University of Science and Technology in Accra and obtained his Bachelor of Science degree in marketing in 2012. He also attended the University of Ghana and obtained his diploma in Public Administration in 2007. He holds another certificate from UNITAR, Switzerland in International debt players from United Nations. He holds a certification from the Chartered Institute of Marketing in the United Kingdom and has obtained a diploma in Advertising and Marketing. Kwadwo has an Executive Masters in Public administration from Ghana Institute of Management and Public Administration (GIMPA)

Politics 
Agyemang is a member of the New Patriotic Party (NPP). In 2012, he contested for the Asante Akim North seat on the ticket of the NPP sixth parliament of the fourth republic and won with 14,966 votes, which represented 43.64% of the total votes cast. In 2016, he did not contest in the 2016 Ghanaian elections. Instead, Andy Kwame Appiah-Kubi who was elected by the New Patriotic Party members represented the party in the elections.

Presently, Kwadwo is the Governing Board  Chairman of National sports Authority.

Personal life 
Agyemang identifies as a Christian who fellowships at the Resurrection Power Living Bread Christian Center. He is married with two children.

References 

Living people
1975 births
University of Ghana alumni
New Patriotic Party politicians
Ghanaian MPs 2013–2017
Ghana Institute of Management and Public Administration alumni
People from Ashanti Region